Virovitica County was a historic administrative subdivision (županija) of the Kingdom of Croatia-Slavonia. Croatia-Slavonia was an autonomous kingdom within the Lands of the Crown of Saint Stephen (Transleithania), the Hungarian part of the dual Austro-Hungarian Empire. Its territory is now in eastern Croatia. The name of the county comes from the town of Virovitica (in Hungarian: Verőce). The capital of the county moved from Virovitica to Osijek (Croatian, in Hungarian: Eszék) in the late 18th century.

Geography
Virovitica County shared borders with the Hungarian counties of Somogy, Baranya, Bács-Bodrog, and the Croatian-Slavonian counties of Srijem, Požega and Bjelovar-Križevci. The county stretched along the right (southern) bank of the river Drava, down to its confluence with the river Danube. Its area was 4867 km² around 1910.

History
The territory of Virovitica County was part of the Kingdom of Croatia when it entered into personal union with the Kingdom of Hungary in 1102, and with it became part of the Habsburg monarchy in 1526. It was conquered by Ottoman Empire between 1541 and 1552. Ottoman rule in it lasted till 1687. The County was re-established in 1718, after it was retaken from Ottoman rule. In 1920, by the Treaty of Trianon the county became part of the newly formed Kingdom of Serbs, Croats and Slovenes (later renamed to Yugoslavia). Since 1991, when Croatia became independent from Yugoslavia, the county is part of Croatia.

Demographics
In 1900, the county had a population of 243,101 people and was composed of the following linguistic communities:

Total:

 Croatian: 114,018 (46.9%)
 German: 43,577 (17.9%)
 Serbian: 41,998 (17.3%)
 Hungarian: 33,298 (13.7%)
 Slovak: 4,278 (1.8%)
 Ruthenian: 94 (0.0%)
 Romanian: 21 (0.0%)
 Other or unknown: 5,817 (2.4%)

According to the census of 1900, the county was composed of the following religious communities:

Total:

 Roman Catholic: 188,139 (77.4%)
 Serbian Orthodox: 42,381 (17.4%)
 Jewish: 5,044 (2.1%)
 Calvinist: 4,396 (1.8%)
 Lutheran: 2,330 (1.0%)
 Greek Catholic: 116 (0.0%)
 Unitarian: 8 (0.0%)
 Other or unknown: 147 (0.0%)

In 1910, the county had a population of 272,430 people and was composed of the following linguistic communities:

Total:

 Croatian: 137,394 (50.4%)
 German: 40,766 (15.0%)
 Serbian: 46,658 (17.1%)
 Hungarian: 37,656 (13.8%)
 Slovak: 3,691 (1.4%)
 Ruthenian: 439 (0.2%)
 Romanian: 64 (0.0%)
 Other or unknown: 5,762 (2.1%)

According to the census of 1910, the county was composed of the following religious communities:

Total:

 Roman Catholic: 211,206 (77.5%)
 Serbian Orthodox: 47,994 (17.6%)
 Jewish: 5,199 (2.0%)
 Calvinist: 5,112 (1.9%)
 Lutheran: 2,176 (0.8%)
 Greek Catholic: 677 (0.2%)
 Unitarian: 1 (0.0%)
 Other or unknown: 65 (0.0%)

Subdivisions
In the early 20th century, the subdivisions of Verőce county were:

See also
Osijek-Baranja County of Croatia

References

Literature
 
 
 

 
1920 disestablishments in Europe
Former counties of Croatia
Counties in the Kingdom of Hungary
States and territories established in the 12th century
History of Slavonia